The 1998 Heineken Cup Final was the final match of the 1997–98 Heineken Cup, the third season of Europe's top club rugby union competition. The match was played on 31 January 1998 at the Stade du Parc Lescure in Bordeaux. The match was contested by Bath of England and Brive of France. Bath won the match 19–18.

Match details

See also
1997–98 Heineken Cup

Final
1998
Hein
Hein
Heineken Cup Final 1998
Bath Rugby matches
CA Brive matches